This list includes plant species found in the state of North Carolina. Varieties and subspecies link to their parent species.

Introduced species are designated (I).

Polypodiales
Onocleaceae
Sensitive fern, Onoclea sensibilis

Pinales
Cupressaceae
Atlantic white cedar, Chamaecyparis thyoides
Eastern red cedar, Juniperus virginiana
Baldcypress, Taxodium distichum
Pinaceae
Fraser fir, Abies fraseri
Red spruce, Picea rubens
Shortleaf pine, Pinus echinata
Longleaf pine, Pinus palustris
Table mountain pine, Pinus pungens
Pitch pine, Pinus rigida
Pond pine, Pinus serotina
Eastern white pine, Pinus strobus
Loblolly pine, Pinus taeda
Virginia pine, Pinus virginiana
Eastern hemlock, Tsuga canadensis

Laurales
Lauraceae
Sassafras, Sassafras albidum

Magnoliales
Magnoliaceae
Yellow poplar, Liriodendron tulipifera
Cucumber tree, Magnolia acuminata
Fraser magnolia, Magnolia fraseri
Southern magnolia, Magnolia grandiflora
Sweetbay, Magnolia virginiana

Alismatales
Alismataceae
Broadleaf arrowhead, Sagittaria latifolia
Araceae
Jack-in-the-pulpit, Arisaema triphyllum
Eastern skunk cabbage, Symplocarpus foetidus

Asparagales
Amaryllidaceae
Canada onion, Allium canadense
Ramp, Allium tricoccum
Asparagaceae
False lily-of-the-valley, Maianthemum canadense
Smooth Solomon's-seal, Polygonatum biflorum
Adam's needle, Yucca flaccida
Iridaceae
Dwarf crested iris, Iris cristata
Narrow-leaf blue-eyed-grass, Sisyrinchium angustifolium
Orchidaceae
Dragon's mouth orchid, Arethusa bulbosa
Tuberous grass pink, Calopogon tuberosus
Rosebud orchid, Cleistesiopsis divaricata
Crane-fly orchid, Tipularia discolor

Liliales
Colchicaceae
Perfoliate bellwort, Uvularia perfoliata
Liliaceae
Yellow trout lily, Erythronium americanum
Catesby's lily, Lilium catesbaei
Carolina lily, Lilium michauxii
Sandhills lily, Lilium pyrophilum
Turk's cap lily, Lilium superbum
Melanthiaceae
Painted trillium, Trillium undulatum
Smilacaceae
Cat greenbriar, Smilax glauca

Arecales
Arecaceae
Cabbage palmetto, Sabal palmetto
Dwarf palmetto, Sabal minor

Commelinales
Commelinaceae
White mouth dayflower, Commelina erecta

Poales
Poaceae
Japanese stiltgrass, Microstegium vimineum (I)
Torpedograss, Panicum repens (I)
Dallis grass, Paspalum dilatatum (I)

Ranunculales
Berberidaceae
American barberry, Berberis canadensis
Mayapple, Podophyllum peltatum
Ranunculaceae
Rue anemone, Thalictrum thalictroides

Proteales
Platanaceae
American sycamore, Platanus occidentalis

Saxifragales
Altingiaceae
Sweetgum, Liquidambar styraciflua

Vitales
Vitaceae
Muscadine, Vitis rotundifolia

Oxalidales
Oxalidaceae
Great yellow woodsorrel, Oxalis grandis
Violet wood-sorrel, Oxalis violacea

Malpighiales
Passifloraceae
Yellow passionflower, Passiflora lutea
Salicaceae
Eastern cottonwood, Populus deltoides
Swamp cottonwood, Populus heterophylla
White Willow, Salix alba (I)
Weeping willow, Salix babylonica (I)
Carolina willow, Salix caroliniana
Black willow, Salix nigra
Violaceae
American field pansy, Viola bicolor
Canada violet, Viola canadensis
Halberd-leaved yellow violet, Viola hastata
Sweet violet, Viola odorata (I)
Bird's-foot violet, Viola pedata
Common blue violet, Viola sororia

Fabales
Fabaceae
Redbud, Cercis canadensis
Honey locust, Gleditsia triacanthos
Chinese bushclover, Lespedeza cuneata (I)
Kudzu, Pueraria montana (I)
Black locust, Robinia pseudoacacia
Pink fuzzybean, Strophostyles umbellata
White clover, Trifolium repens (I)
American wisteria, Wisteria frutescens

Rosales
Cannabaceae
Sugarberry, Celtis laevigata
Hackberry, Celtis occidentalis
Moraceae
Red mulberry, Morus rubra
Rosaceae
Serviceberry, Amelanchier arborea
Carolina laurelcherry, Prunus caroliniana
Pin cherry, Prunus pensylvanica
Black cherry, Prunus serotina
Carolina rose, Rosa carolina
Ulmaceae
Winged elm, Ulmus alata
American elm, Ulmus americana
Slippery Elm, Ulmus rubra

Fagales
Betulaceae
Yellow birch, Betula alleghaniensis
Sweet birch, Betula lenta
River birch, Betula nigra
Hornbeam, Carpinus caroliniana
Eastern hop hornbeam, Ostrya virginiana
Fagaceae
American chestnut, Castanea dentata
Chinkapin, Castanea pumila
American beech, Fagus grandifolia
White oak, Quercus alba
Scarlet oak, Quercus coccinea
Southern red oak, Quercus falcata
Turkey oak, Quercus laevis
Overcup oak, Quercus lyrata
Blackjack oak, Quercus marilandica
Swamp chestnut oak, Quercus michauxii
Chestnut oak, Quercus montana
Water oak, Quercus nigra
Cherrybark oak, Quercus pagoda
Pin oak, Quercus palustris
Willow oak, Quercus phellos
Northern red oak, Quercus rubra
Post oak, Quercus stellata
Black oak, Quercus velutina
Live oak, Quercus virginiana
Juglandaceae
Bitternut hickory, Carya cordiformis
Pignut hickory, Carya glabra
Pecan, Carya illinoinensis (I)
Shagbark hickory, Carya ovata
Mockernut hickory, Carya tomentosa
Black walnut, Juglans nigra
Myricaceae
Southern wax myrtle, Myrica cerifera

Myrtales
Onagraceae
Pinkladies, Oenothera speciosa

Sapindales
Anacardiaceae
Staghorn sumac, Rhus typhina
Poison ivy, Toxicodendron radicans
Poison sumac, Toxicodendron vernix
Sapindaceae
Boxelder, Acer negundo
Red maple, Acer rubrum
Sugar maple, Acer saccharum
Yellow buckeye, Aesculus flava

Malvales
Malvaceae
Seashore mallow, Kosteletzkya virginica
American basswood, Tilia americana

Brassicales
Brassicaceae
Virginia pepperweed, Lepidium virginicum

Caryophyllales
Cactaceae
Eastern prickly pear, Opuntia humifusa
Droseraceae
Venus flytrap, Dionaea muscipula
Montiaceae
Carolina springbeauty, Claytonia carolinian
Virginia springbeauty, Claytonia virginica
Phytolaccaceae
American pokeweed, Phytolacca americana
Portulacaceae
Kiss-me-quick, Portulaca pilosa

Cornales
Cornaceae
Silky dogwood, Cornus amomum
Flowering dogwood, Cornus florida
Stiff dogwood, Cornus foemina
Hydrangeaceae
Smooth hydrangea, Hydrangea arborescens
Silverleaf hydrangea, Hydrangea radiata
Nyssaceae
Water tupelo, Nyssa aquatica
Blackgum, Nyssa sylvatica

Ericales
Ebenaceae
Common persimmon, Diospyros virginiana
Ericaceae
Whitewicky, Kalmia cuneata
Mountain laurel, Kalmia latifolia
Indian pipe, Monotropa uniflora
Sourwood, Oxydendrum arboreum
Flame azalea, Rhododendron calendulaceum
Pinxter flower, Rhododendron periclymenoides
Northern highbush blueberry, Vaccinium corymbosum
Creeping blueberry, Vaccinium crassifolium
Deerberry, Vaccinium stamineum
Honeycup, Zenobia pulverulenta
Primulaceae
Shooting star, Primula meadia
Theaceae
Loblolly-bay, Gordonia lasianthus
Sarraceniaceae
Yellow pitcherplant, Sarracenia flava
Hooded pitcherplant, Sarracenia minor
Purple pitcher plant, Sarracenia purpurea
Sweet pitcherplant, Sarracenia rubra
Styracaceae
Carolina silverbell, Halesia carolina

Gentianales
Apocynaceae
Hemp dogbane, Apocynum cannabinum
Butterfly weed, Asclepias tuberosa
Asclepiadaceae
Common milkweed, Asclepias syriaca
Gelsemiaceae
Yellow jessamine, Gelsemium sempervirens
Gentianaceae
Rosepink, Sabatia angularis
Rubiaceae
Azure bluet, Houstonia caerulea

Solanales
Solanaceae
Jimsonweed, Datura stramonium
Convolvulaceae
Common morning-glory, Ipomoea purpurea (I)

Lamiales
Acanthaceae
American water-willow, Justicia americana
Carolina wild petunia, Ruellia caroliniensis
Bignoniaceae
Trumpet vine, Campsis radicans
Lamiaceae
Ground-ivy, Glechoma hederacea (I)
Lyre-leaf sage, Salvia lyrata
Lentibulariaceae
Southern bladderwort, Utricularia juncea
Oleaceae
White ash, Fraxinus americana
Carolina ash, Fraxinus caroliniana
Green ash, Fraxinus pennsylvanica
Orobanchaceae
Scarlet painted-cup, Castilleja coccinea
Phrymaceae
Allegheny monkeyflower, Mimulus ringens
Scrophulariaceae
Common mullein, Verbascum thapsus (I)

Aquifoliales
Aquifoliaceae
American holly, Ilex opaca

Asterales
Asteraceae
Giant ragweed, Ambrosia trifida
Common daisy, Bellis perennis (I)
Woolly elephant's foot, Elephantopus tomentosus
Dogfennel, Eupatorium capillifolium
Sweetscented joe pye weed, Eutrochium purpureum
Ox-eye daisy, Leucanthemum vulgare (I)
Tall goldenrod, Solidago gigantea
Campanulaceae
Cardinal flower, Lobelia cardinalis
Indian tobacco, Lobelia inflata

Apiales
Apiaceae
Queen Anne's lace, Daucus carota (I)
Golden alexanders, Zizia aurea

Dipsacales
Caprifoliaceae
Japanese honeysuckle, Lonicera japonica (I)

References
USDA PLANTS Database

External links
Common Forest Trees of North Carolina

 
North Carolina
Flora